Professor T. is a German TV crime-drama series set in Cologne about an eccentric professor at Cologne University, Jasper Thalheim, who is an advisor to the police. It is an adaptation from the Belgian TV series of the same name which has also a remake by the same name in France. There are four seasons with four episodes each, after which the series concluded. All episodes were aired on the German broadcasting channel ZDF.

Premise 
Professor Jasper Thalheim – known to his students as Professor T. – is an expert for psychological criminology at the University of Cologne. For that, he is admired as well as redoubtable. T suffers from OCD: he wants everything to be in order and clean, wearing blue medical gloves most of the time. For his former Student Anneliese Deckert and her colleague Daniel Winter – both work for the criminal investigation department in Cologne – Professor T. is their only hope to solve almost unsolvable crimes.

But working with Professor T. is difficult because of his own minor psychological disorders. He innocently insults everybody around him, immediately identifies the weaknesses of a person, and his observations are annoyingly always right. But Anneliese and Daniel are unperturbed and build an unbeatable team with Professor T. Chief Commissioner Paul Rabe disapproves and feels left out. Christina Fehrmann, head of the criminal investigation department, considers T's collaboration with mixed feelings because she and T were once a couple.

Episodes

Season 1

Season 2 
From September 11 till November 10 Season 2 has been shot in Cologne and its surroundings. In opposition to the first season, season two hasn't been broadcast on Saturdays at 9.45 pm but on Fridays at 8.15 pm.

Season 3

Season 4

Review 
The German newspaper Frankfurter Allgemeine Zeitung wrote about the first season of Professor T., that Jasper Thalheim (Matthias Matschke) and Anneliese Deckert (Lucie Heinze) have the potential to become identification figures with humour for the ZDF like the successful investigators of the Tatort in Münster are for the ARD.

The German newspaper Neue Osnabrücker Zeitung praises the lead actor Matthias Matschke, because he succeeded in playing Professor T. as an arrogant dislikable guy with vulnerability and helplessness.

Frankfurter Neue Presse praises Matschke's acting, but criticises characterisation of the criminals.

Awards and nominations 
In 2017, leading Actor Matthias Matschke was nominated for Deutscher Comedypreis as Best Actor for his role Professor T. as well as for his performance in the comedy show Sketch History.

References

External links 
 
 Professor T on ZDF
 Professor T - German Remake on Beta Film

German drama television series
German crime television series
2010s German police procedural television series
ZDF original programming
2017 German television series debuts
German-language television shows
Obsessive–compulsive disorder in fiction